Longacre Press  was a publisher based in Dunedin, New Zealand. The company was founded in 1995 by Barbara Larson, Paula Boock, and Lynsey Ferrari, three former workers at Dunedin's McIndoe Publishing. The company was originally based in Dowling Street, close to the city's Exchange neighborhood, but later moved to Moray Place in the city centre.

Longacre specialized in a wide range of non-fiction art, self-help, outdoors, food and natural history and also junior and young-adult fiction. It picked up numerous national book awards, and published work by noted writers such as Owen Marshall, Brian Turner, Lynley Hood, and Jack Lasenby.

In 2003, the company expanded, taking on the catalogue of Christchurch boutique publishers, Shoal Bay Press. At about the same time, the distribution of Longacre's books changed from Macmillan Books to Random House.  In 2009, Longacre was acquired by Random House.

References

Sources
The New Zealand Writer's Handbook
Writers & Artists' Yearbook

Book publishing companies of New Zealand
Mass media in Dunedin
New Zealand companies established in 1995
Mass media companies established in 1995